Proterogyrinidae is an extinct family of tetrapods within the group Embolomeri that lived in the Carboniferous period. The most well-known genus is Proterogyrinus.

References

Embolomeres
Pennsylvanian first appearances
Pennsylvanian extinctions